Robin Hughes Harris Sr. (August 30, 1953 – March 18, 1990) was an American comedian and actor, best known for his recurring comic sketch about "Bébé's Kids". He was posthumously nominated for the Independent Spirit Award for Best Supporting Male for his performance in film House Party.

Childhood
Robin Harris was born in Chicago, Illinois. His father, Earl, was a welder, and his mother, Mattie, was a factory seamstress.

In 1961, the family moved to Los Angeles, where he attended Manual Arts High School. Harris then attended Ottawa University in Kansas. During this time, he began to hone his craft of comedy. He worked for Hughes Aircraft, a rental car company, and Security Pacific Bank to pay his bills. In 1980, he debuted at Los Angeles' Comedy Store.

Career
During the mid-1980s, Harris worked as the master of ceremonies at the Comedy Act Theater. His "old school" brand of humor began to gain him a mainstream following. Harris made his acting debut playing a bartender in I'm Gonna Git You Sucka (1988). Harris also had roles in 1989's Do the Right Thing and Harlem Nights. Harris played the father of Kid in House Party (1990). He followed up later that year with a small role as a jazz club MC in Mo' Better Blues.

Bé-bé's Kids
In Harris' "Bé-bé's Kids" routines, Harris' girlfriend Jamika would insist that he take her son and her friend Bé-bé's three children with them on a date, as she continually agreed to babysit them. The children would regularly make a fool out of and/or annoy Harris. "We Bé-bé's kids", they would proclaim, "we don't die...we multiply."

The Hudlin Brothers had intended to make a feature film based upon the "Bé-bé's Kids" sketches, but Harris died while the film was in pre-production. Bébé's Kids instead became an animated feature. It was directed by Bruce W. Smith and featured the voices of Faizon Love (as Harris), Vanessa Bell Calloway, Marques Houston, Nell Carter, Jonell Green,
Rich Little, and Tone Lōc.

Death
In the early hours of March 18, 1990, Harris died in his sleep of a heart attack in the hotel room of his hometown Chicago's Four Seasons Hotel after performing for a sold out crowd at the Regal Theater, at the age of 36. His brother found him dead. Harris was transported back to California and interred in an indoor mausoleum at Inglewood Park Cemetery, near Los Angeles.

At the time of Harris's March 1990 death, his wife was pregnant with their son, Robin Harris Jr., who was born six months later, in September 1990.

In 2006, a posthumous DVD, titled We Don't Die, We Multiply: The Robin Harris Story (2006), was released. The film features never-before-seen performances by Harris and accolades from such contemporaries as Martin Lawrence, Bernie Mac, Cedric the Entertainer, D. L. Hughley, Robert Townsend, and Joe Torry. The film features a rap performed and dedicated to Harris by his son, Robin, Jr.

Award nominations

References

External links

 
 
 

1953 births
1990 deaths
Male actors from Chicago
Comedians from Illinois
Ottawa University alumni
African-American male actors
American male film actors
American stand-up comedians
African-American male comedians
American male comedians
African-American stand-up comedians
American male voice actors
Burials at Inglewood Park Cemetery
20th-century American comedians
20th-century American male actors
20th-century African-American people